Wang Wei (born October 1970) is a Chinese billionaire entrepreneur, who is the founder and chairman of SF Express, a Shenzhen-based multinational delivery services and logistics company.

As of November 9, 2022, Wangwei is the sixth-wealthiest man in China, with a networth of US$19.6 billion.

Early life
Wang Wei was born in Shanghai, China. His father was a Russian language translator for the Chinese Air Force, and his mother was a university professor. At age 7, Wang's family moved to Hong Kong, where he attended primary and secondary school. After graduating, Wang did not go to university, but instead went to work in the manufacturing sector.

Career
Wang's career started in print and dyeing factories in Shunde District, Foshan, a commercial and manufacturing center in Guangdong province with easy river access to Hong Kong.

In the early 1990s, factories in Shunde needed to get samples to Hong Kong-based buyers, but frequently had issues with long shipping delays. To speed up this process, Wang founded ShunFeng Express as a small courier service with six employees.

As of 2017, SF Express is a multinational courier service with over 400,000 employees.

According to Forbes, Wang Wei has a net worth of US$26.7 billion, as of July 2021.

Personal life
He lives in Shenzhen, China.

References 

1970 births
Living people
Businesspeople from Shanghai
Billionaires from Shanghai
SF Express people
Chinese company founders
Chinese businesspeople in shipping
Chinese billionaires
Chinese technology company founders